Tommy Adams (12 February 1916 – 1984) was a Scottish footballer best known for his time at East Fife.

Adams signed for East Fife in 1935 from Neilston Victoria. He was a member of the 1938 Scottish Cup winning side and also won the Scottish League Cup in 1947, scoring in a 4-1 victory over Falkirk. He made 10 appearances for Hamilton Academical and scored 1 goal. Adams also played for Greenock Morton, Forfar Athletic and Hibernian.

References

External links 
Tommy Adams

Scottish footballers
Association football wingers
East Fife F.C. players
Forfar Athletic F.C. players
Scottish Football League players
1916 births
1984 deaths
Date of death missing
Footballers from Glasgow
Neilston Victoria F.C. players